SAP Anywhere is a front office software package from SAP SE (SAP) for small and medium sized enterprises (SMBs) with 10 – 500 employees.  Early 2018 SAP decided to sunset the product and to focus in the SMB market on the established SAP Business One and SAP Business ByDesign ERP solutions.

SAP Anywhere includes several front office applications that is intended to help retail and wholesale businesses market and sell their products and services through multiple sales channels including in-store, direct sales, and online. This system facilitates effective customer relationship management by allowing business owners to review and direct their marketing, inventory, and direct customer experiences using a single system on their mobile devices. According to research firm International Data Corporation (IDC), many small businesses struggle with out of date processes, and fail to optimise online business tools.  
E-Commerce is an increasing factor for maintaining relationships with customers.  SAP Anywhere is intended to allow small businesses to take advantage of the digital revolution and increase their customer reach through e-commerce, both in business-to-business (B2B) and business-to-consumer (B2C) channels.  President of global channels and general business at SAP, Rodolpho Cardenuto, said in 2016, "The more than 79 million small and midsize companies worldwide are the lifeblood of the economy." SAP Anywhere is primarily used by SMBs, with about 20% of its clients falling outside of the SMB category.

History
SAP Anywhere was launched by SAP and China Telecom on 20 October 2015, in Mainland China. SAP is a German multinational software corporation, headquartered in Walldorf, Baden-Württemberg, Germany.  Founded in 1972, SAP focuses on creating enterprise software.  In 2014, SAP created a new division to focus on SMB (small-medium business) customers, SMB Solutions Group. SMB software preceding SAP Anywhere includes: 
SAP Business One: automates key business functions in financials, operations, and human resources through dynamic ERP software
SAP Business ByDesign: A fully integrated on-demand enterprise resource planning and business management software.  
SAP Business All-in-One: Automates core processes
Others products include Crystal Reports, SAP Lumira, and SAP Edge Solutions

China Telecom, established in 2000, is the largest fixed-line service provider in the People’s Republic of China, and the third largest mobile telecommunication provider in China.  In developing SAP Anywhere, SAP utilised the telecommunications infrastructure of China Telecom, and developed a product customised for the Chinese market.  SMBs represent two thirds of all businesses in China.

Initial plans for release focused on building a strong customer base in China before expanding to other markets.  Due to competitive pressure, SAP released SAP Anywhere to the English-speaking market earlier than planned.  UK availability was announced in March 2016, 
and US availability was announced in May 2016. A Canadian pilot is currently planned for 2016.

Features
SAP Anywhere is a cloud based SaaS (software as a service), delivered by SAP in the public cloud (Amazon cloud for the US market).  SAP Anywhere can be accessed through mobile devices or desktops. It includes applications for: 
e-commerce website(s)/online store 
customer relationship management 
digital marketing
Point of Sale
order fulfillment management 
inventory management

SAP Anywhere uses SAP HANA, which enables data to be captured and mined in real time, allowing for accurate inventory, sales, and order management across multiple channels.

SAP Anywhere integrates with Constant Contact or MailChimp, and with payment gateways like PayPal and Stripe.  SAP Anywhere uses secure transactions and secure sockets layer (SSL) protection. As well, SAP Anywhere has integrated with delivery company UPS.  SAP Anywhere allows businesses to utilise Google's productivity and collaboration tools to interact with customers through Google Apps. Integration with internal and back office enterprise resource planning applications like HR and finance are also available.

See also
Cloud Computing
Customer Experience
Front Office
List of SAP products
Online Shopping

References

External links
Guidelines For ERP Implementation

Customer relationship management software
Business-to-business
Cloud applications
ERP software
Proprietary database management systems
SAP SE
As a service
2015 software